The following is a list of the best-selling female music artists in the United Kingdom, based solely on sales units published by reliable music industry-related organizations, including the British Phonographic Industry, the Official Charts Company, Music Week and Record Mirror.

30 million or more units

20 million to 30 million units

10 million to 20 million units

8 million to 10 million units

1 million to 8 million units

Notes

References

See also
 List of best-selling music artists
 List of best-selling female music artists
 List of best-selling girl groups
 List of best-selling albums by women
 List of best-selling female rappers
 Women in music

Female
Lists of women in music
British music industry
British music-related lists
Albums, best-selling